The 1960 Los Angeles Dodgers finished the season at 82–72, in fourth place in the National League race, 13 games behind the NL and World Champion Pittsburgh Pirates.

Offseason
 November 30, 1959: Steve Bilko was drafted from the Dodgers by the Detroit Tigers in the 1959 rule 5 draft.

Regular season

Season standings

Record vs. opponents

Notable transactions
 April 5, 1960: Fred Kipp was traded by the Dodgers to the New York Yankees for Gordie Windhorn and Dick Sanders.
 April 8, 1960: Don Zimmer was traded by the Dodgers to the Chicago Cubs for Ron Perranoski, Johnny Goryl, career minor leaguer Lee Handley, and cash.
 April 11, 1960: Johnny Klippstein was purchased from the Dodgers by the Cleveland Indians.
 May 6, 1960: Rip Repulski was traded by the Dodgers to the Boston Red Sox for Nelson Chittum.
 May 7, 1960: Sandy Amorós was traded by the Dodgers (from the minor-league Montreal Royals) to the Detroit Tigers for Gail Harris.
 June 15, 1960: John Glenn was traded by the Dodgers to the St. Louis Cardinals for Jim Donohue.
 June 15, 1960: Clem Labine was traded by the Dodgers to the Detroit Tigers for Ray Semproch and cash.
 July 9, 1960: Tommy Lasorda was released by the Dodgers (from the minor-league Montreal Royals).

Opening Day lineup

Roster

Player stats

Batting

Starters by position 
Note: Pos = Position; G = Games played; AB = At bats; H = Hits; Avg. = Batting average; HR = Home runs; RBI = Runs batted in

Other batters 
Note: G = Games played; AB = At bats; H = Hits; Avg. = Batting average; HR = Home runs; RBI = Runs batted in

Pitching

Starting pitchers 
Note: G = Games pitched; IP = Innings pitched; W = Wins; L = Losses; ERA = Earned run average; SO = Strikeouts

Other pitchers 
Note: G = Games pitched; IP = Innings pitched; W = Wins; L = Losses; ERA = Earned run average; SO = Strikeouts

Relief pitchers 
Note: G = Games pitched; W = Wins; L = Losses; SV = Saves; ERA = Earned run average; SO = Strikeouts

Awards and honors 
1960 Major League Baseball All-Star Game – Game 1
Norm Larker reserve
Charlie Neal reserve
Stan Williams reserve
Johnny Podres reserve
1960 Major League Baseball All-Star Game – Game 2
Norm Larker reserve
Charlie Neal reserve
Stan Williams reserve
Johnny Podres reserve
National League Rookie of the Year
Frank Howard
Gold Glove Award
Wally Moon
TSN Rookie of the Year Award
Frank Howard
NL Player of the Month
Don Drysdale (July 1960)

Farm system 

LEAGUE CHAMPIONS: Atlanta, Reno

Notes

References 
Baseball-Reference season page
Baseball Almanac season page

External links 
1960 Los Angeles Dodgers uniform
Los Angeles Dodgers official web site

Los Angeles Dodgers seasons
Los Angeles Dodgers season
Los Angel